Mons Dieter is a mountain (hill) on the Moon, located in King, an impact crater (along with other peaks Mons André, Mons Ardeshir, Mons Dilip), at . The mountain was named Dieter, a German male name, in 1976. The mountain is never visible from the Earth, as it is located on the far side of the Moon.

References

External links 
 Mons Dieter at International Astronomical Union website
Mons Dieter at The Moon Wiki

Mountains on the Moon